Koshin is a Southern Bantoid language of Cameroon. It is traditionally classified as a Western Beboid language, but that has not been demonstrated to be a valid family.

"Koshin" is the name of the village the language is spoken in.

Phonology 

There are three tones; high, mid, and low.

References

 Blench, Roger, 2011. 'The membership and internal structure of Bantoid and the border with Bantu'. Bantu IV, Humboldt University, Berlin.
Good, Jeff, & Jesse Lovegren. 2009. 'Reassessing Western Beboid'. Bantu III.
Good, Jeff, & Scott Farrar. 2008. 'Western Beboid and African language classification'. LSA.

Beboid languages
Languages of Cameroon